The Common Turkic alphabet is a project of a single Latin alphabet for all Turkic languages based on a slightly modernized Turkish alphabet. The old system was developed in the Soviet Union and used in the 1920-1930s; the current system is an alphabet with 34 letters recognised by the Organization of Turkic States. Its letters are as follows:

 Long forms of vowels are shown with a Circumflex (in Turkish): Â, Ê, Î, Ô, Û.

History 
In connection with the collapse of the USSR, in the newly formed republics in which the Turkic languages were the main ones, the ideas of Pan-Turkism became popular again, and, as a consequence, so did the movement for the restoration of the Latin alphabet. In order to unify, and at the initiative of Turkey in November 1991, an international scientific symposium was held in Istanbul on the development of a unified alphabet for the Turkic languages. It was completely based on the Turkish alphabet, but with the addition of some missing letters: ä, ñ, q, w, x. As a result, the alphabet consisted of 34 letters, 29 of which were taken from Turkish.

Azerbaijan was the first to adopt this alphabet in December 1991 and Uzbekistan proposed its adoption in September 1993, while continuing using Cyrillic. In September 1993, at a regular conference in Ankara, representatives of Azerbaijan, Turkmenistan and Uzbekistan officially announced the transition to the new alphabet. 

However, already in 1992, Azerbaijan was reforming its alphabet and replacing the letter ä with ə, taken from old Cyrillic and Yañalif. Starting from 2000, the government decreed that Azerbaijani publications and media should use the Latin script only, officially discontinuing the Cyrillic alphabet in the country.

In May 1995, the government of Uzbekistan replaced this alphabet's proposal alphabet in favor of a different one, based only on the standard 26-letter Latin alphabet. The same version is accepted for the Karakalpak language.

Although Turkmenistan committed itself to adopt the original alphabet, it officially adopted a different proposal in 1993 with some unusual characters as letters such as the pound sign (£), the cent sign (¢) and the dollar sign ($). This was later replaced by a different alphabet in 1999, which is only partially similar to the general Turkic one, but differs from it in a number of letters. Due to this uncertainty with the Latin alphabet proposals employed by the government, opposition political forces continue to employ the Turkmen Cyrillic alphabet.

As a result, only Azerbaijani (1991, with one letter changed in 1992), Gagauz (1996), Crimean Tatar (1992, officially since 1997), Tatar in the Tatar Wikipedia (since 2013) and some mass media have used the common Turkic alphabet with minor changes (since 1999).

The Tatar Latin script, introduced in September 1999 and canceled in January 2005, used a slightly different set of additional letters (ŋ instead of ñ, ə instead of ä), and the letter ɵ instead of Turkish ö.  Since December 24, 2012, the common Turkic alphabet has been officially used as a means of transliterating the Tatar Cyrillic alphabet.

In 2019, an updated version of the Uzbek Latin alphabet was revealed by the Uzbek government, with five letters being updated; it was proposed to represent the sounds "ts", "sh", "ch", "oʻ" and "gʻ" by the letters "c", "ş", "ç", "ó" and "ǵ", respectively. This reverses a 1995 reform, and brings the orthography closer to that of Turkish and also of Turkmen, Karakalpak, Kazakh (2018 version) and Azerbaijani.

In April 2021, a revised version of the Kazakh Latin alphabet was presented, introducing the letters Ä ä (Ə ə), Ö ö (Ө ө), Ü ü (Ү ү), Ğ ğ (Ғ ғ), Ū ū (Ұ ұ), Ñ ñ (Ң ң), and Ş ş (Ш ш). This version will be officially implemented starting 2023.

Grapheme-phoneme correspondences
The orthographies of Turkic languages are largely phonetic, meaning that the pronunciation of a word can usually be determined from its spelling. This rule excludes recent loanwords such as proper names.

 Semi-vowels (Glottal Letters) are shown with a breve (or caron in Chuvash): Ă, Ĕ, Ĭ, Ŏ, Ŭ.
 The  phoneme (Latin Š or Ť, Arabic ث, Cyrillic Ҫ) is only present in the Bashkir language.
 The  phoneme (Latin Ž or Ď, Arabic ذ, Cyrillic Ҙ) is only present in the Bashkir language. 
 Ä is sometimes written as Əə or Ǝǝ (Latin glyphs).
 Some handwritten letters have variant forms. For example: Čč=Jj, Ķķ=Ⱪⱪ, and Ḩḩ=Ⱨⱨ.
 The Cyrillic Ѕ, Љ, and Њ  may be written as Ӡ, Ԡ, and Ԣ respectively.
ٯ = ق (representing ) or ڨ (representing ).
Ṡ (ص), Ż (ظ), and Ṫ (ط) are used to represent the front and back variants of the letters S, Z, and T/D respectively. They are commonly found at the beginning of words to indicate all following vowels will be back vowels. If the sounds S, Z, T, or D occur in the middle of a word with exclusively back vowels, they may appear in their "soft" or neutral forms of S (س), Z (ز), T (ت) or D (د). (The letter Ṫ (ط) can represent the back vowel variants of T and D). Unlike Turkish, Arabic does not have vowel-dependent placement rules for these letters; they appear wherever emphatic consonants occur and can thus be seen in any part of the word. Some examples include Ṡahib, Ṡabun, Huṡuṡ, Ṡabr, etc.

Non-Turkic (Cyrillic or Arabic) Letters 

 Ţ (T-cedilla) is a letter originating as part of the Romanian alphabet, used to represent the Romanian and Moldovan phoneme , the voiceless alveolar affricate (like ts in bolts). It is written as the letter T with a small comma below and it has both lower-case and the upper-case variants. It is also a part of the Gagauz alphabet and the Livonian alphabet. The letter corresponds to Cyrillic Tse (Ц) in the romanisation of Cyrillic Turkic alphabets.
 Ḑ (D-cedilla) is a letter originating as part of the old Romanian alphabet, used to represent the old Romanian and Moldovan sound , the voiced alveolar affricate. It is written as the letter D with a small comma below, and it has both lower-case and the upper-case variants. It is also a part of the Livonian alphabet. The letter corresponds to Cyrillic Dze (Ѕ) in the romanisation of Cyrillic Turkic alphabets.
Ḋ (ض) is only used for Arabic transcriptions; the emphatic consonant it represents does not exist in Turkic languages. For example: Ramaḋan, Kaḋı, Kaḋa, Ḋarb, Ḋarbe, Arḋ, etc.
 The Latin letter Ë (E-umlaut) has no relation to the Cyrillic letter Ё (Yo). The Latin letter Ë represents the sound sequence  and thus corresponds to the Cyrillic letter Є in Ukrainian or Е in Russian.
 The Cyrillic Ѕ, Љ and Њ all originate in the Serbian and Macedonian alphabets and represent the same phonemes as in the CTA.

In the USSR

The New Turkic alphabet (Jaꞑalif, 'Yañalif') was a Latin alphabet used by non-Slavic peoples of the USSR in the 1920-1930s. The new alphabet utilised the basic Latin letters excluding "w", as well as some additional letters, with a number of them being based on Cyrillic letterforms. The correspondences between the Soviet Yañalif and modern CTA are given below.

Keyboard layout

The standard Turkish keyboard layout for personal computers is as follows:

Bibliography 
 Heinz F. Wendt: Fischer Lexikon Sprachen, 1961
 Bilal N. Şimşir: Türk Yazi Devrimi, Ankara 1992, S. 119
 Helmut Glück (Hrsg.): Metzler Lexikon Sprache, 2005 [S. 417] 
 Proceedings of the International Symposium of Contemporary Turkish Alphabet (Milletlerarası Çağdaş Türk Alfabeleri Sempozyumu Bildirisi), 1991, İstanbul, M.Ü. Türkiyat Araştırmaları Enstitüsü, 1992 .
 Zentrum für Türkeistudien, Essen: Aktuelle Situation in den Turkrepubliken – Innenpolitik, Sicherheitspolitik, Wirtschaft, Umwelt, Bevölkerung  (Working Paper 14, 1994)
 FSP Entwicklungssoziologie, Bielefeld: Formen der Transvergesellschaftung als gegenläufige Prozesse zur Nationsbildung in Usbekistan (Working Paper 334, 2000)
 Der Fischer Welt Almanach '94 – Zahlen, Daten, Fakten, 1993 (S. 846)
 Mehmet Tütüncü: Alphabets for the Turkic languages
 Herbert W. Duda: Die neue türkische Lateinschrift. I. Historisches. In: Orientalistische Literaturzeitung 1929, Spalten 441–453. – II. Linguistisches. In: Orientalistische Literaturzeitung 1930, Spalten 399–413.
 F.H. Weißbach: Die türkische Lateinschrift. In: Archiv für Schreib- und Buchwesen 1930, S. 125–138.
 Yakovlev N.F. "Development and succeeding problems in Latinizing alphabets", No 2, 1936, pp. 25–38 (In Russian) Н.Ф. Революция и письменность
 Луначарский. Латинизация русской письменности
 Статья «Новый алфавит» в Литературной энциклопедии
 Nevzat Özkan, Gagavuz Türkçesi Grameri, Türk Dil Kurumu Yayınları, 1996
 Jaŋalif/Яңалиф". Tatar Encyclopedia. (2002). Kazan: Tatarstan Republic Academy of Sciences Institution of the Tatar Encyclopaedia
 Закиев. Тюрко-татарское письмо. История, состояние, перспективы. Москва, "Инсан", 2005
 G.A Gaydarci, E.K Koltsa, L.A.Pokrovskaya B.P.Tukan, Gagauz Türkçesinin Sözlüğü, TC Kültür Bakanlığı Yayınları
Nevzat Özkan, Gagauz Destanları, Türk Dil Kurumu Yayınları
 Prof. Dr. Mustafa Argunşah-Âdem Terzi-Abdullah Durkun, Gagauz Türkçesi Araştırmaları Bilgi Şöleni, Türk Dil Kurumu Yayınları
Gagauzum Bucaktır Yerim, Tatura Anamut Ocak Yayınları
 Yakovlev N.F. "Development and succeeding problems in Latinizing alphabets", "Revolution and script" No 2, 1936, pp. 25–38 (In Russian) Н.Ф. ЯКОВЛЕВ: «О развитии и очередных проблемах латинизации алфавитов», Революция и письменность, № 2, 1936, стр. 25–38
 Minglang Zhou (2003). Multilingualism in China: the politics of writing reforms for minority languages, 1949–2002. Volume 89 of Contributions to the sociology of language (illustrated ed.). Published Walter de Gruyter. p. 174. . Retrieved 2011-01-01.

Notes

References

External links 
 Kitabs, the unique highlight of the Belarusian language

See also
Latinisation (USSR)

Latin alphabets
Turkic alphabets
1930s in the Soviet Union
Alphabets used by Turkic languages